Jon Michael Peha is a full professor of electrical engineering at Carnegie Mellon University. Peha holds a Ph.D. in electrical engineering from Stanford University and BS from Brown University. He is also known for his work at SRI International, Bell Labs, and Microsoft.

Peha was a recipient of the Brown Engineering Medal in 2013 and was named a fellow of the American Library Association in 2017. He was named a Fellow of the Institute of Electrical and Electronics Engineers (IEEE) in 2012 for his contributions to wireless and broadband technology for public safety communications.

References

External links

1963 births
Living people
American electrical engineers
Stanford University alumni
Carnegie Mellon University faculty
Fellow Members of the IEEE
Place of birth missing (living people)

Brown University School of Engineering alumni